is a 1984 fixed shooter arcade game developed and released by Namco. It is the third game in the Galaxian series, serving as a direct sequel to Galaga (1981). In North America, a modification kit was later released to change the name to Galaga 3, possibly to reflect its position in the series. It was the only game other than Phozon to run on the Namco Phozon hardware. A contemporary home port for the Commodore 64 was released in 1988. A "demastered" version of the game (in the style of the Nintendo Entertainment System) was included in Namco Museum Archives Vol. 2 as a bonus title.

Gameplay

The objective of Gaplus is to score as many points as possible by defeating successive waves of enemies in levels called "Parsecs". Its core gameplay is very similar to Galaga: Enemies fly onto the screen in rows and join a formation near the top, then begin attacking the player's ship with kamikaze-like dives. The ship can move left and right, as well as vertically. Bonus lives are earned at certain score intervals, and can also be gained by collecting ship parts dropped by some enemies, as well as collecting Rally-X bonus flags from shooting stars. The player loses a life when struck by an enemy or one of their shots; the game ends when all lives are lost.

Certain enemies drop upgrades that include a tractor beam which the player can use to capture enemies, a large drill that can destroy many enemies at once, powerups that temporarily slow down enemies or nullify their shots, and parts to create a new ship that awards an extra life when completed. Some stages begin with the star field reversing direction, with harder and faster waves of enemies appearing before resuming a normal formation.

The game features bonus "Challenging Stages" just as Galaga did. However, instead of defeating a certain number of enemies, the objective of the challenging stage in Gaplus is to juggle enemies by hitting them as many times as possible. Each hit grants a dot (represented by a bee) in a word or phrase, with extra hits adding to horizontal lines above and below the word. Spelling the entire word or phrase will earn a bonus related to that phrase, and each hit scores bonus points at the end of the round.

Reception
In Japan, Game Machine listed Gaplus on their May 15, 1984 issue as being the most-successful table arcade unit of the month.

Legacy
The arcade version of Gaplus was released on mobile phones, and is also part of Namco Museum Remix (2007) and Namco Museum Megamix (2010) for the Wii with its original title being used. The original version was later re-released under its original name for the Wii Virtual Console on March 25, 2009. In 2011, Gaplus was released for iOS devices as part of Galaga 30th Collection, featuring updated visuals, sound, and achievements.

In 2020, Namco released a "demastered" version of the game as a bonus game in the Namco Museum Archives Vol. 2 compilation. Developed by M2, this game emulates the visual style of the Nintendo Entertainment System, similar to the NES-style remake of Pac-Man Championship Edition in Vol. 1.

Notes

References

External links
 
 A site with in-depth details on Gaplus (Japanese)

1984 video games
Arcade video games
Commodore 64 games
Fixed shooters
Galaxian
Midway video games
Namco arcade games
Nintendo Switch games
PlayStation 4 games
Video games developed in Japan
Virtual Console games
Mastertronic games
Hamster Corporation games